Semnan may refer to:

 Semnan Province, a province in Iran
 Semnan County, a county in the Semnan Province of Iran
 Semnan, Iran, a city in the Semnan County of Iran

See also 
 Semnani (disambiguation)